The 2016 National Premier Soccer League season was the 104th season of FIFA-sanctioned soccer in the United States, and the 14th season of the NPSL.

Regions and Conferences

Changes from 2015

Incoming teams

Moved and/or Rebranded teams

Outgoing teams

Standings

Northeast Region

Atlantic Conference

Top scorers

Keystone Conference

Mid-Atlantic Conference

South Region

South Atlantic Conference

South Central Conference

Southeast Conference

Sunshine Conference

Midwest Region

Central Conference

Great Lakes East Conference

Great Lakes West Conference

West Region

Golden Gate Conference

Northwest Conference

Southwest Conference

Playoffs

South Atlantic Conference Playoffs

Bold = winner* = after extra time, = penalty shootout score

South Central Conference Playoffs

Bold = winner* = after extra time, = penalty shootout score

Southeast Conference Playoffs

Bold = winner* = after extra time, = penalty shootout score

Regional and National Playoffs

Bold = winner* = after extra time, = penalty shootout score

NPSL League Awards

Attendances
Teams with an average home attendance of at least 1,000:

References

External links
 2016 NPSL attendance figures

 
2016